Robert Hudson Tannahill (April 1, 1893 – September 25, 1969) was a Detroit art collector and benefactor.

Early life
Tannahill was a nephew of department store magnate Joseph Lowthian Hudson and a cousin of Eleanor Clay Ford, wife of Henry Ford's only son Edsel. He was the only son of Robert Blyth Tannahill and Anna Elizabeth Hudson. His father, Robert Blyth Tannahill (born in Detroit in 1863) in 1889 joined J. L. Hudson in the retail trade; married Anna Elizabeth Hudson who was one of three sisters of J. L. Hudson; by 1900, served as vice-president of the successful J. L. Hudson Department Store. Robert Hudson Tannahill was born and grew-up in the William Van Moore/Robert Blyth Tannahill Home located in 67 Peterboro in the Peterboro-Charlotte Historic District in Midtown Detroit, built in 1882.

Art Collector 
Tannahill donated 475 works of art donated during his lifetime plus cash totaling $550,000 to the Detroit Institute of Arts (DIA). The museum received 557 additional works bequeathed upon his death that were valued at approximately $13,000,000.  His total gifts constitute a major portion of the permanent collection of the DIA. One of the paintings that Tannahill bequeathed to the DIA, The Diggers by Vincent Van Gogh, was the object of a restitution claim from the heirs of Martha Nathan, who had owned the painting before fleeing Nazi Germany. The DIA hired provenance researchers to conduct an 18 month study into the history of the painting, which Tannahill had acquired in 1941, and when they concluded that the Van Gogh had not been looted by Nazis, the DIA's legal team filed a "quiet title" lawsuit against the heirs. The museum successfully invoked a statute of limitations and retained custody of the painting.

Tannahill served as a member of the City of Detroit Arts Commission from 1930 to 1962 and was instrumental in establishing the Detroit Artists Market.  His collection focused on 19th- and 20th-century artists including Paul Cézanne, Jean-Baptiste-Camille Corot, Edgar Degas, Paul Gauguin, Juan Gris, Paul Klee, John Marin, Henri Matisse, Amedeo Modigliani, Claude Monet, Georgia O'Keeffe, Pierre-Auguste Renoir, Georges Rouault and Georges Seurat.  His collection also included a significant number of African sculptures.

References

American art collectors
American philanthropists
People from Detroit
1969 deaths
1893 births
People associated with the Detroit Institute of Arts